Preventive (also called prophylactic) treatment of migraine can be an important component of migraine management. Such treatments can take many forms, including everything from surgery, taking certain drugs or nutritional supplements, to lifestyle alterations such as increased exercise and avoidance of migraine triggers.

The goals of preventive therapy are to reduce the frequency, painfulness, and/or duration of migraine attacks, and to increase the effectiveness of abortive therapy. Another reason to pursue these goals is to avoid medication overuse headache (MOH), otherwise known as rebound headache, which is a common problem among migraineurs. This is believed to occur in part due to overuse of pain medications, and can result in chronic daily headache.

Standards for the conducts of trials of preventive medications have been proposed by the Task Force of the International Headache Society Clinical Trials Subcommittee.

Behavioral treatments
Exercise for 15–20 minutes per day may be helpful for reducing the frequency of migraine attacks.

Diet, visualization, and self-hypnosis are also alternative treatments and prevention approaches. General dietary restriction has not been demonstrated to be an effective approach to treating migraine.

Sexual activity has been reported by a proportion of males and females with migraine to relieve migraine pain significantly in some cases.

Medications
A 2006 review article by S. Modi and D. Lowder offers some general guidelines on when a physician should consider prescribing drugs for migraine prevention:

Preventive medication has to be taken on a daily basis, usually for a few weeks, before the effectiveness can be determined. Supervision by a neurologist is advisable. A large number of medications with varying modes of action can be used. Selection of a suitable medication for any particular patient is a matter of trial and error, since the effectiveness of individual medications varies widely from one patient to the next. Often preventive medications do not have to be taken indefinitely. Sometimes as little as six months of preventive therapy is enough to "break the headache cycle" and then they can be discontinued.

The most effective prescription medications include several drug classes.

Beta blockers
A meta-analysis found that propranolol had an "overall relative risk of response to treatment (here called the 'responder ratio')" was 1.94.

Anticonvulsants
Anticonvulsants such as valproic acid and topiramate. A meta-analysis by the Cochrane Collaboration of ten randomized controlled trials or crossover studies, which together included 1341 patients, found anticonvulsants had an "2.4 times more likely to experience a 50% or greater reduction in frequency with anticonvulsants than with placebo" and a number needed to treat of 3.8. However, concerns have been raised about the marketing of gabapentin.

Antidepressant
Tricyclic antidepressants (TCAs) such as amitriptyline and the newer selective serotonin reuptake inhibitors (SSRIs) such as fluoxetine are sometimes prescribed. TCAs have been found to be more effective than SSRIs. SSRIs are no more effective than placebo. Another meta-analysis found benefit from SSRIs among patients with migraine or tension headache; however, the effect of SSRIs on only migraines was not separately reported.

Other
A wide range of other pharmacological drugs have been evaluated to determine their efficacy in reducing the frequency or severity of migraine attacks. These drugs include beta-blockers, calcium antagonists, neurostabalizers, nonsteroidal anti-inflammatory drugs (NSAIDs), tricyclic antidepressants, selective serotonin reuptake inhibitors (SSRIs), other antidepressants, and other specialized drug therapies. The US Headache Consortium lists five drugs as having medium to high efficacy: amitriptyline, divalproex, timolol, propranolol and topiramate. Lower efficacy drugs listed include aspirin, atenolol, fenoprofen, flurbiprofen, fluoxetine, gabapentin, ketoprofen, metoprolol, nadolol, naproxen, nimodipine, verapamil and Botulinum A. Additionally, most antidepressants (tricyclic, SSRIs and others such as Bupropion) are listed as "clinically efficacious based on consensus of experience" without scientific support. Many of these drugs may give rise to undesirable side-effects, or may be efficacious in treating comorbid conditions, such as depression.

 Methysergide was withdrawn from the US market by Novartis, but is available in Canadian pharmacies. Although highly effective, it has rare but serious side effects, including retroperitoneal fibrosis. 
 Methylergometrine remains available in the US and is an active metabolite of methysergide. It is thought to carry the same risks and benefits as methysergide but has not been widely studied in migraine.
 Memantine, which is used in the treatment of Alzheimer's Disease, is beginning to be used off label for the treatment of migraine. It has not yet been approved by the FDA for the treatment of migraine.
 Aspirin can be taken daily in low doses such as 80 mg. The blood thinners in ASA have been shown to help some migraineurs, especially those who have an aura.
 Placebo is as effective as adding propanolol to patients not adequately controlled on topiramate. In a randomized controlled trial, both groups reduced their days with migraine by half.
 L-cysteine as a slow release formulation is being studied for migraine prevention.

Medical devices

Transcutaneous electrical nerve stimulation
A transcutaneous electrical nerve stimulation device called Cefaly was approved by the Food and Drug Administration (FDA) in the United States on March 11, 2014, for the prevention of migraine; this was the first medical device to get FDA approval for this purpose.

Neurostimulation
Neurostimulation initially used implantable neurostimulators similar to pacemakers for the treatment of intractable chronic migraine with encouraging good results. But the needed surgery with implantable neurostimulators is limiting the indication to severe cases.

Transcranial magnetic stimulation
At the 49th Annual meeting of the American Headache Society in June 2006, scientists from Ohio State University Medical Center  presented medical research on 47 candidates that demonstrated that TMS — a medically non-invasive technology for treating depression, obsessive compulsive disorder and tinnitus, among other ailments — helped to prevent and even reduce the severity of migraine among its patients. This treatment essentially disrupts the aura phase of migraine before patients develop full-blown migraine attack.

In about 74% of the migraine headaches, TMS was found to eliminate or reduce nausea and sensitivity to noise and light. Their research suggests that there is a strong neurological component to migraine. A larger study will be conducted soon to better assess TMS's complete effectiveness.

Biofeedback
Biofeedback has been used successfully by some to control migraine symptoms through training and practice. Biofeedback helps patient to be conscious of some physiologic parameters to control them and try to relax. This method is considered to be efficient for migraine prevention.

Surgery

There have been major pharmacological advances for the treatment of migraine headaches, yet patients must still endure symptoms until the medications take effect. Furthermore, often they still experience a poor quality of life despite an aggressive regimen of pharmacotherapy. Migraine surgery techniques have proven most effective in selected patients, often resulting in permanent migraine prevention. The most effective appear to be those involving the surgical cauterization of the superficial blood vessels of the scalp (the terminal branches of the external carotid artery), and the removal of muscles in areas known as "trigger sites".

Arterial surgery

Surgical cauterization of the superficial blood vessels of the scalp (the terminal branches of the external carotid artery) is only carried out if it has been established with certainty that these vessels are indeed the source of pain. It is a safe and relatively atraumatic procedure which can be performed in a day facility.

Nerve decompression

Migraine surgery which involves decompression of certain nerves around the head and neck may be an option in certain people who do not improve with medications. It is only effective in those who respond well to Botox injections in specific areas.

Botulinum toxin injection

Botulinum neurotoxin (Botox) injections have been approved in the US and UK for prevention of chronic migraine, but do not appear to work for episodic migraine. Several invasive surgical procedures are currently under investigation. One involves the surgical removal of specific muscles or the transection of specific cranial nerve branches in the area of one or more of four identified trigger points.

Closure of patent foramen ovale

There also appears to be a causal link between the presence of a patent foramen ovale (PFO) and migraine. There is evidence that the correction of the congenital heart defect, PFO, reduces migraine frequency and severity. Recent studies have advised caution, though, in relation to PFO closure for migraine, as insufficient evidence exists to justify this dangerous procedure.

Alternative medicine

Acupuncture
Cochrane reviews have found that acupuncture is effective in the treatment of migraine. The use of "true" acupuncture seems to be slightly more effective than sham acupuncture, however, both "true" and sham acupuncture appear to be at least similarly effective as treatment with preventative medications, with fewer adverse effects.

Supplements
Butterbur
Native butterbur contains some carcinogenic compounds, but a purified version, Petadolex, does not. A systematic review of two trials totalling 293 patients (60 and 233 patients) showed "moderate evidence of effectiveness ... for a higher than the recommended dose of the proprietary Petasites root extract Petadolex in the prophylaxis of migraine."
 
Cannabis
Cannabis was a standard treatment for migraine from 1874 to 1942. It has been reported to help people through an attack by relieving the nausea and dulling the head pain, as well as possibly preventing the headache completely when used as soon as possible after the onset of pre-migraine symptoms, such as aura.

Feverfew

The plant feverfew (Tanacetum parthenium) is a traditional herbal remedy believed to reduce the frequency of migraine attacks. A number of clinical trials have been carried out to test this claim, but a 2004 review article concluded that the results have been contradictory and inconclusive.

Manual therapy
A systematic review stated that chiropractic manipulation, physiotherapy, massage and relaxation might be as effective as propranolol or topiramate in the prevention of migraine headaches; however, the research had some problems with methodology.

References

Migraine
Preventive medicine